Ernest Richard Sulik (July 7, 1910 – May 31, 1963), was a Major League Baseball outfielder who played in  with the Philadelphia Phillies. He batted and threw right-handed.

He was born in San Francisco, California and died in Oakland, California.

External links

Baseball players from San Francisco
Major League Baseball pitchers
Philadelphia Phillies players
1910 births
1963 deaths
San Francisco Dons baseball players
Nashville Vols players